Duke Yi of Wey, given name Chi, was a Zhou dynasty feudal lord and the 18th ruler of Wey. He was best known for his absurd life-style which led to a temporary fall of his state and his permanent death.

Life 
Chi was the son of Duke Hui of Wey. He succeeded his father in the year of 668 BCE. The Records of the Grand Historian and Zuo Zhuan recorded that Duke Yi was an enthusiast of crane breeding. He was so fond of this type of bird that when Di people invaded his country, he sent off cranes to fight on the battlefield in the hope of a victory over the invaders. He led the army himself and fought the Di people in the battle of Yingze. In the end, the duke was defeated.

In the winter of 660 BCE, Di people destroyed the defense of Wey army and ruined the city of Chao Ge; today's Qi county of Henan Province. Duke Yi was killed.

After Duke Yi's death, Duke Huan of Qi built a city in Chuqiu for Duke Yi's successor Duke Dai. The state's life-span was prolonged thanks to Duke Huan.

His death marked the end of Wey's existence in Chao Ge, the city which Shu Feng of Kang received from his brother Duke Zhou.

References 

Monarchs of Wey (state)
Zhou dynasty nobility